The Day of the Troll is an exclusive to audio Doctor Who story, produced as part of BBC Books' New Series Adventures line, and the fifth entry in the series to be produced. Written by author Simon Messingham and read by series star David Tennant, it features the Tenth Doctor travelling alone. It was released on CD on 8 October 2009.

Synopsis

Part One
Siblings Karl and Katy are in an old, scary forest – Karl winding his sister up. We learn that Katy is a former "medical type", and that the two are involved in experiments – experiments that are being ruined by something.

Charlie and the Doctor drive a 4x4 towards the bridge. The Doctor asks for details on the Grange. Charlie explains that humans used a process dubbed Global Cooling, refreezing glaciers. The ground left behind was poisonous, and food became incredibly value, leading to violence. Karl Baring started work on growing new crops, but so far, hasn't succeeded – running out of money, depending on charity.

Sanders contacts Petra to tell her the relay link's down – they can't contact Madrid. Either they were shut off in Madrid, or the local relays have been sabotaged.
Suddenly, Campbell is grabbed by the troll. The Doctor manages to grab it, and recognises its face – it's Karl Baring. They struggle, the Doctor is knocked down, and the troll attacks.

Part Two
Petra fights the troll off with a branch, releasing the Doctor. He tries to grab the creature with a parka, but underfoot, the ground forms tentacles which attempt to drag them under.
Petra helps the Doctor trap the troll with her own coat, and the limbs disintegrate.

Bryant's lackey Stephenson sedates Katy, ready to be taken to the bridge. Two troopers bring Tim Hill into the room  Sanders intends to walk to the coast, taking an emergency flare.
Petra stands up to Bryant, telling him not to take Katy. He orders Chavez to shoot her.
After a face-off, Petra stands down, and Bryant tells Chavez to put his gun away.
The Doctor realises that the Spheriosis is under the house – it's enormous. Above, he hears the helicopter being boarded.
Nonetheless, the helicopter reaches the scorched riverbank. Explosives have damaged the soil, but the bridge is still intact.
They leave the helicopter, and spot a flare in the distance – Sanders, proving that the Spheriosis reaches far away.

In the cellar, the Doctor hears the Spheriosis under the ground again. He jumps for the stairs, and a trunk of roots breaks through the ground into the cellar. The Doctor calls for help, attracting the trunk's attention. It shoots at the Doctor, just as the door is unlocked. The Doctor escapes, and the door is closed by Vanessa.

A creature breaks through the ground – the troll. Behind them, Bryant takes the car and drives away. Around them, more arms break through the ground – more trolls. The Doctor guesses the way to keep Karl fighting is to put Katy in maximum danger – to take her under the bridge.

Bryant speeds away, avoiding the creatures. He drives for the bank, but crashes, activating the airbag and stalling the engine. A troll attacks the car as Bryant tries to get it going again – and then a second troll, followed by a whole pack of them.

The Doctor hauls the troll under the bridge, and throws it at Katy. She recognises Karl as he sighs, and the entire creature disintegrates – including the tentacles outside.

The Doctor digs his way out of the ground, pulling Katy back after him. She tells her Karl managed to kill the creature.

Outside references
The Tenth Doctor encounters a creature acting very much like a troll under the bridge.

Critical reception
Doctor Who Magazine reviewer Vanessa Bishop criticised the resemblance to a "classic Tom Baker story", but praised David Tennant's reading of the story.

References

Audiobooks based on Doctor Who
Tenth Doctor audio plays
2009 audio plays
Works by Simon Messingham